Get Smart, Again! is a 1989 American made-for-television comedy film based on the 1965–1970 NBC/CBS sitcom Get Smart! starring Don Adams and Barbara Feldon reprising their characters of Maxwell Smart and Agent 99. It originally aired February 26, 1989 on ABC (the network that rejected the original pilot for Get Smart!).

Synopsis
Maxwell Smart, acting as a protocol officer since CONTROL was disbanded in the early 1970s, is reactivated as a counterintelligence agent by Commander Drury, of the United States Intelligence Agency. KAOS, long considered defunct, has been revitalized by a corporate takeover. Its first scheme involves turning a forgotten American scientist and using his weather control machine to extort US$250 billion from the United States Government. (This plot is similar to the one used in the 1998 Avengers movie, another film based on a 1960s TV spy series.)

Drury, convinced that only Smart has the expertise to combat KAOS, gives him carte blanche to reactivate former CONTROL agents to assist him in his task. Along with Drury's bumbling aide, Beamish, Smart recruits Larrabee, who, believing that he was under orders from Richard Nixon to stay at his post until relieved, has been living in his office in the now-abandoned CONTROL headquarters tending his office plants, Agent 13, Hymie the Robot (now employed as a crash test dummy) and ultimately, his wife, 99, to find the security leak that allowed the scientist to defect, locate the weather machine and disarm it. They are opposed by a KAOS mole (John de Lancie) within the USIA, who is able to predict Max's every move with the aid of stolen copies of 99's unpublished memoirs.

The visible head of the KAOS scheme is revealed to be Max's old nemesis, Siegfried, but he is merely the agent of a higher executive whom even he has never met. This new leader is finally revealed as Nicholas Demente, 99's publisher, who intends not only to extort the money but also to create weather that will keep people eternally indoors and interfere with television reception, forcing millions of Americans to entertain themselves by buying Demente's books and publications. Max, 99, and Beamish infiltrate KAOS with the aide of Siegfried's twin brother Doctor Helmut Schmelding. After defeating Demente's henchmen with medieval weaponry, the CONTROL agents kill Demente with his own weather machine. Max and 99 celebrate by causing it to snow.

Legacy
The relative success of the film prompted the development of a short-lived (only seven episodes) 1995 weekly series on Fox, also titled Get Smart, with Don Adams and Barbara Feldon reprising their characters.  It was dedicated to the memory of Edward Platt.

Home media
The film has been released twice on DVD.

See also
Get Smart (TV series)
Get Smart (2008 film)

References

External links
 
 YouTube - Get Smart, Again intro

1989 television films
1989 films
American comedy television films
American spy comedy films
Get Smart films
Spy television films
Films based on television series
Television series reunion films
Films directed by Gary Nelson
Television films based on television series
1980s spy comedy films
1980s American films